Vaturi is a surname. Notable people with the surname include:

Andrea Vaturi (born 1982), Italian ice dancer
Nissim Vaturi (born 1969), Israeli politician
Simone Vaturi (born 1988), Italian ice dancer